St. Gabriel's Roman Catholic Church is a parish located in the Riverdale section of The Bronx, New York. The parish was created in 1939 by Francis Spellman, then the Archbishop of New York, as the successor to the St. Gabriel's Church on East 37th Street in Manhattan, which was razed in 1937 to accommodate the construction of the Queens–Midtown Tunnel. The pews, altars and statues of the original church were relocated to the new structure, and many of the church's Irish-American congregants also moved to the Bronx to be near their parish. The Right Reverend Francis W. Walsh, pastor of the Church of the Assumption in Peekskill, New York, and president of the College of New Rochelle, was named pastor  – a post he held until his retirement in 1969.

The St. Gabriel's complex encompasses a church, elementary school and rectory. In 2004, St. Gabriel's was at the center of a zoning debate when a real estate developer unsuccessfully attempted to pay $7.2 million to build a new church and rectory and to renovate the church's school in exchange for the sale of air rights to build a 30-story condominium on the site of the rectory.

References

External links
St. Gabriel’s Roman Catholic Church website
St. Gabriel's School website

Roman Catholic churches in the Bronx
Demolished churches in New York City
Demolished buildings and structures in the Bronx
Roman Catholic churches completed in 1939
20th-century Roman Catholic church buildings in the United States